The Socialist Federation of Algeria was the branch of the French Socialist Party (SFIO) in Algeria. The Federation was founded in 1908.

See also
Oran socialiste

References

Defunct political parties in Algeria
French Section of the Workers' International
Socialist parties in Algeria
1908 establishments in Algeria
Political parties established in 1908
Political parties with year of disestablishment missing